James Ellsworth Morris (born December 11, 1984), is an American professional wrestler, better known by the ring name James Ellsworth. He is best known for his tenure with WWE.

Ellsworth began his career in 2002 and worked for 14 years on the independent circuit as Jimmy Dream. In 2016, he had a squash match against Braun Strowman in WWE. He became famous with the quote “any man with two hands has a fighting chance” After this appearance, he became very popular with the fans and, months later, WWE signed him to a contract. He was subsequently featured in a high-profile storyline between Dean Ambrose and then-WWE Champion AJ Styles. Later, he began a storyline where he became the manager of Carmella. After his departure from WWE in 2018, he created his own championship, dubbed the Intergender Championship, which he defended in various promotions on the independent circuit.

Early life 
Morris was born in Baltimore, Maryland on December 11, 1984. He trained under Axl Rotten.

Professional wrestling career

Independent circuit (2002–2016) 
Throughout most of his career, Morris has performed on the independent circuit under the ring name "Pretty" Jimmy Dream, often as part of a tag team with Adam Ugly as The Pretty Ugly. The duo has won several regional championships throughout the Northeastern United States, including American Combat Wrestling, Big Time Wrestling and First State Championship Wrestling. Pretty Ugly debuted in 302 Pro Wrestling at their first show.

In 2006, Morris made his Combat Zone Wrestling (CZW) debut at CZW Tournament of Death V teaming with Drew Gulak on a losing end to BLKOUT (Ruckus and Robbie Mireno). Morris returned to CZW again in 2009, losing to Jon Dahmer in a battle royal.

On April 24, 2009 at Covey Promotions All Or Nothing 3, Morris defeated Draven, Thomas Rodriguez and Crazii Shea in a four-way ladder match to become the Covey Promotions Cruiserweight Champion. On June 27 at Hot and Bothered, Morris dropped the championship to Crazii Shea. Morris also runs a professional wrestling promotion known as Adrenaline Championship Wrestling (ACW), which was founded in September 2009.

On June 4, 2016, Pretty Ugly won a tournament to be crowned the inaugural 302 Pro Wrestling Tag Team Champions by defeating The Dub Boys and Riot City's Most Wanted in the tournament finals.

WWE

Early appearances (2014–2016) 
Prior to his initial WWE run, Morris appeared a couple of times as one of Adam Rose's "Rosebuds" whenever the company was in the Baltimore area. As James Ellsworth, he had his first WWE singles match on the July 25, 2016 episode of Raw as an enhancement talent, being quickly defeated by Braun Strowman. Ellsworth gained some praise and subsequently developed a cult following due to his meek appearance and enthusiastic pre-match promo in which he declared that "any man with two hands has a fighting chance" before being easily defeated by Strowman.

WWE Championship pursuit (2016) 
Ellsworth resurfaced in the main event of the September 13 episode of SmackDown as the mystery tag team partner for WWE World Champion AJ Styles against Dean Ambrose and John Cena, only to be attacked by Intercontinental Champion The Miz (his replacement in the actual match) as he walked down to the ring. On the October 11 episode of SmackDown, Ellsworth was chosen by Styles as his opponent in a non-title match, but SmackDown General Manager Daniel Bryan made Ambrose the special guest referee for the match. Ambrose favored Ellsworth during the match due to his rivalry with Styles, culminating in Ambrose attacking Styles and allowing Ellsworth to win. Ellsworth was granted a championship match the following week, with Ambrose serving as the timekeeper and ring announcer; Ellsworth won the match by disqualification. Ellsworth continued to offer assistance to Ambrose in his rivalry with Styles, but this backfired on the October 25 episode of SmackDown, when Ellsworth accidentally cost Ambrose a match after executing No Chin Music on Styles, disqualifying Ambrose. On the November 1 episode of SmackDown, Ellsworth interfered in the rematch, distracting Styles and allowing Ambrose to win an opportunity for the title. SmackDown Commissioner Shane McMahon also named Ellsworth the SmackDown mascot for the 2016 Survivor Series match on the November 8 episode of SmackDown.

During Survivor Series on November 20, Ellsworth helped eliminate Braun Strowman by countout by holding onto his leg, only for Strowman to chase Ellsworth up the ramp and put him through a table, injuring his neck. After legitimately signing a WWE contract, this was worked into a storyline on the 22 November episode of SmackDown, when Styles goaded the injured Ellsworth to face him in a ladder match for the right to be a SmackDown superstar with his contract suspended above the ring; Ellsworth agreed, but wanted another shot at the World Championship should he win the match. That night, Ellsworth defeated Styles to win a SmackDown contract, due to Ambrose helping Ellsworth again. On the 29 November episode of SmackDown, Ellsworth suffered a storyline injury after Styles interrupted his Ambrose Asylums segment with Ambrose, attacking both and delivering a Styles Clash to Ellsworth off the steel steps, which caused Ellsworth to be taken on a stretcher by medical personnel.

This led Ellsworth interfering on December 4 at TLC: Tables, Ladders & Chairs during the Tables, Ladders and Chairs between Styles and Ambrose to help the latter, but he ended up turning heel by helping Styles instead by pushing Ambrose off the ladder and sent him through two tables. Ellsworth explained that since he had already beaten Styles three times, he helped Styles because he wanted to defeat him again, this time for the World Championship, a match McMahon granted him for the following episode of SmackDown. Ellsworth tried to make it up to Ambrose by helping him defeat The Miz for the Intercontinental Championship on the December 6 episode of SmackDown, but his effort backfired and eventually cost Ambrose the match. Ellsworth's title opportunity was twice postponed, first due to Styles being legitimately injured; and the second time due to Ellsworth suffering from a kayfabe cold. The match eventually happened on the December 20 episode of SmackDown, during which Styles easily defeated Ellsworth in under a minute to end their storyline.

 Managing Carmella (2017–2018) 
After his storyline with Styles and Ambrose ended, Ellsworth allied himself with Carmella. On the January 3, 2017 episode of SmackDown, Ellsworth started accompanying Carmella to the ring for her matches, helping her win. Ellsworth entered the 2017 Royal Rumble match at number 11, but was eliminated by Dean Ambrose and Braun Strowman after only 15 seconds. Ellsworth made his WrestleMania debut on April 2 at WrestleMania 33, managing Carmella in the six-pack challenge for the SmackDown Women's Championship which was won by Naomi. On April 25, Carmella and Ellsworth formed an alliance with Natalya and the returning Tamina. On the May 16 episode of SmackDown, Carmella scored a victory over Naomi in a non-title match via distraction from Ellsworth. Dubbed The Welcoming Committee, the team of Carmella, Natalya and Tamina managed by Ellsworth defeated Flair, Lynch and Naomi in a six-woman tag team match on May 21 at Backlash. On June 18 at Money In the Bank, he helped Carmella win the first ever Women's Money in the Bank ladder match by pushing Becky Lynch off the ladder and dropping the briefcase to Carmella.

Two days later on SmackDown, Carmella was stripped of the briefcase and a second Money in the Bank ladder match was set by SmackDown General Manager Daniel Bryan for the June 27 episode of SmackDown, where Carmella regained the briefcase after she won the second match, once again with the help of Ellsworth, who was initially banned from the arena. On the following episode of SmackDown, he was fined $10,000 and suspended for 30 days by Bryan due to his disobedience. Ellsworth returned on the August 8 episode of SmackDown and once again interfered to help Carmella defeat SmackDown Women's Champion Naomi in a non-title match. After weeks of tension, Ellsworth lost an intergender match to Becky Lynch and was attacked by Carmella after the match on the November 7 episode of SmackDown, ending his relationship with Carmella as well as marking his last appearance in WWE for nearly a year.

On June 17, 2018 at Money in the Bank, Ellsworth made his return to WWE, by helping Carmella retain the SmackDown Women's Championship against Asuka, reestablishing himself as a heel and reigniting his on-screen relationship with Carmella from 2017 on a night to night contract. At Extreme Rules, Ellsworth was suspended above the ring in a shark cage during Asuka's rematch with Carmella. Ellsworth tried to escape the cage after breaking the lock, only to become entangled and stuck, distracting Asuka and allowing Carmella to defeat her.
On the July 24 episode of SmackDown, Ellsworth interrupted a SummerSlam WWE Championship contract signing between AJ Styles and Samoa Joe, during which Ellsworth got fired after he insulted General Manager Paige. He later appeared at SmackDown 1000, on a video uploaded to WWE's website and YouTube account, where he claimed he should have been a part of the show.

 Return to independent circuit (2018–present) 
On January 21, 2018, Ellsworth made an appearance for Destiny World Wrestling, where he won the first-ever Santino Cobra Cup, interfering in a match between Austin Aries and Pete Dunne and using his Cobra Cup win to challenge Dunne to a match which he lost via pinfall. On February 11, Ellsworth appeared for Championship Wrestling From Hollywood, where he challenged Nick Aldis for the NWA World Heavyweight Championship, but he was defeated. On February 20, Ellsworth proclaimed himself the World Intergender Champion, creating his own championship. The first defense of the World Intergender Championship came on February 22 at BAR Wrestling, where he defeated Joey Ryan. Ellsworth teamed with Gillberg and captured the ACW Tag Team Championship a second time on April 1. On September 2, Ellsworth teamed with Frank The Clown losing to former WCW World Heavyweight Champion David Arquette and RJ City in a tag team match at Warrior Wrestling 2.

 Impact Wrestling (2018) 
On October 15, 2018, Ellsworth made an appearance at Impact Wrestling pay-per-view Bound for Glory, losing against Eli Drake.

 Championships and accomplishments 

 302 Pro Wrestling 302 Pro Wrestling Tag Team Championship (1 time) – with Adam Ugly
302 Tag Team Championship Tournament (2016)
 Adrenaline Championship Wrestling ACW Light Heavyweight Championship (1 time) 
 ACW Tag Team Championship (2 times) – with Adam Ugly (1) and Gillberg (1)
 Cactus League Wrestling CLW Rated-R Championship (1 time, current)
 Covey Promotions CP Cruiserweight Championship (1 time)
CP Tag Team Championships (1 time) - with Adam Ugly
 Destiny Wrestling Cobra Cup (2018)
 First State Championship Wrestling 1CW Tag Team World Championship (2 times) – with Adam Ugly (1) and Reggie Reg (1)
  Grim's Toy Show Wrestling GTS Inter-Gender Championship (1)
 GTS Tag Team Championship (2 times) - with Grim (2)
 Easter Egg Hunt Winner (2018) International Wrestling Cartel IWC High Stakes Championship (1 time)
 Maryland Wrestling Federation MWF Junior Heavyweight Championship (1 time)
 Maximum Championship Wrestling MCW Cruiserweight Championship (4 times)
 Power Pro Wrestling PPW Tag Team Championship (1 time) – with Adam Ugly
 Pro Wrestling Illustrated'' Ranked No. 410 of the top 500 singles wrestlers in the PWI 500 in 2017
 Undisputed Championship Wrestling'''
 UCW Heavyweight Championship (3 times)
 Dominic Denucci Tournament (2011)

References

External links 

 
 
 
 

1984 births
American male professional wrestlers
Living people
People from Glen Burnie, Maryland
Sportspeople from Baltimore